Kyle Moore (born October 25, 1986) is a former American football defensive end. He was drafted by the Tampa Bay Buccaneers in the fourth round of the 2009 NFL Draft. He played college football at the University of Southern California. He has also been a member of the Detroit Lions, Buffalo Bills and Chicago Bears.

Early years 
An army brat born in Germany, Moore attended Houston County High School in Warner Robins, Georgia, where he was named Georgia Class 5A Defensive Player of the Year as a senior defensive lineman. He had 93 tackles, 22 sacks, 18 deflections, 8 forced fumbles, 2 fumble recoveries and 1 blocked punt (for a touchdown) in 2004.

As a junior in 2003, he made All-Middle Georgia, All-Region and All-County while getting 110 tackles, 23 tackles for loss and 15 sacks. Moore was rated a Four-Star recruit and chose USC over Miami.

College career 
At USC, Moore served as a backup defensive end as a true freshman and sophomore. In 2007, he did a solid job while starting at defensive end, recording 35 tackles, including 3.5 for losses of 29 yards (with 2 sacks for 20 yards), plus 2 interceptions that he returned 38 yards (19.0 avg.), 5 deflections, 1 forced fumble and 1 fumble recovery.

In 2008 Moore had arthroscopic surgery on his knee prior to 2008 spring practice, which limited him in spring drills. He started at defensive end alongside Everson Griffen.

Moore was one of twelve USC players invited to the 2009 NFL Scouting Combine.

College awards and honors 
2009 Senior Bowl invitee.
2008 All-Pac-10 Honorable Mention.
2008 USC Most Inspirational Player.

Professional career

Pre-draft

Tampa Bay Buccaneers 
Moore was drafted by the Tampa Bay Buccaneers in the fourth round (117th overall) of the 2009 NFL Draft. He played in just 15 games (7 of them starts) as a Buccaneer in 2 years due to injuries. He was released on September 2, 2011.

Buffalo Bills 
The Buffalo Bills signed Moore off of the Detroit Lions' practice squad on November 15, 2011.

Chicago Bears 
On April 9, 2013, Moore was signed by the Chicago Bears. He was waived on August 25.

Toronto Argonauts 
Moore was signed by the Toronto Argonauts on April 4, 2014, along with his former USC teammate, Kevin Thomas.

References

External links 
 Official Site
 Toronto Argonauts bio 
 Buffalo Bills bio
 USC Trojans bio

1986 births
Living people
People from Warner Robins, Georgia
Players of American football from Georgia (U.S. state)
American football defensive ends
USC Trojans football players
Tampa Bay Buccaneers players
Detroit Lions players
Buffalo Bills players
Chicago Bears players